"What's in It for Me" is a song by John Berry.

What's in It for Me may also refer to:

 "What's in It for Me" (Amy Diamond song), 2005
 "What's in It for Me", a song by Faith Hill from Breathe
 "What's in It for Me", a song by The Walkmen from Bows + Arrows
 "What's in It for Me?", a song by Hoodoo Gurus from Purity of Essence